Gaja is a surname. Notable people with the surname include:

 Angelo Gaja (born 1940), owner of the Gaja Winery
 Elena Gaja (born 1946), Romanian mezzo-soprano opera singer
 Gabriela Gaja (born 1972), Mexican retired butterfly swimmer
 Giorgio Gaja, Italian jurist
 Leilani Gaja (born 1985), Japanese model and actress

 Gaja (name), feminine given name